Beraku is an extinct Bongo–Bagirmi language of Chad. Speakers have shifted to Chadian Arabic or various Kotoko languages.

References

Bongo–Bagirmi languages